Škrip is a village in Croatia. It is the oldest settlement on the island Brač.

Brač
Populated places in Split-Dalmatia County